Otteana is a genus of crickets in the subfamily Landrevinae and tribe Landrevini.  Species can be found in Vietnam.

Species 
Otteana includes the following species:
Otteana dilinhensis (Otte, 1988) - type species (as Pteroplistus dilinhensis Otte)
Otteana truncicola Gorochov, 1996

References

External links
 

Ensifera genera
crickets
Orthoptera of Indo-China